The Railsbach was an automobile built in Saginaw, Michigan by L. M. Railsbach, in 1914.

History 
L. M. Railsbach, a draughtsman for the Valley Boat & Engine Company, classed the vehicle as a light car, but with its wheel track of 3-ft, it would make it a cyclecar.  The two-seater sold for $350.  It had a water-cooled 4-cylinder, 1.2L engine.  L. M. Railsbach did not incorporate a company and the factory used for production is not known.

References

Defunct motor vehicle manufacturers of the United States
Motor vehicle manufacturers based in Michigan
Defunct manufacturing companies based in Michigan
Brass Era vehicles
Cyclecars
1910s cars
Cars introduced in 1914